This is a list of Tony Awards ceremonies.

This list is current as of the 75th Tony Awards ceremony held on June 12, 2022.

Venues 

 1947–53, 1957–59, 1961–62: Waldorf-Astoria Hotel 
 1954–56: Plaza Hotel
 1960, 1965: Astor Hotel
 1963: Hotel Americana
 1964: New York Hilton
 1966: Rockefeller Center Rainbow Room
 1967–68, 1974, 1976–79, 1985: Shubert Theatre
 1969–70, 1980–81, 1987: Mark Hellinger Theatre
 1971: Palace Theatre
 1972: Broadway Theatre
 1973, 1982: Imperial Theatre 
 1975, 2021: Winter Garden Theatre
 1983–84, 1992–94, 1999: Gershwin Theatre
 1986, 1988, 1991, 1995: Minskoff Theatre
 1989–90: Lunt-Fontanne Theatre
 1996: Majestic Theatre
 1997–98, 2000–10, 2013–15, 2017–19, 2022: Radio City Music Hall
 2011–12, 2016: Beacon Theatre
 2023: United Palace

Networks

Ceremonies

Multiple ceremonies hosted 

The following individuals have hosted (or co-hosted) the Tony Awards ceremony on two or more occasions.

See also
 Broadway theatre
 Laurence Olivier Awards
 Timeline of New York City

References

External links
 Tony Awards history

20th century-related lists
21st century-related lists
American television-related lists
Lists by organization
Lists of events in the United States
Music-related lists
New York City-related lists
Lists of theatre awards
 
Lists of award ceremonies